Mpabwa Sarah Patience (born 6 August 1966) was the representative of the Uganda People's Defence Forces (UPDF) and Member of Parliament in the ninth Parliament of Uganda.

Politics 
She was the elected UPDF Member of Parliament in to the ninth Parliament.  Other elected UPDF MPs in the ninth Parliament included Edward Katumba Wamala, Elly Tumwine Tuhirirwe, David Sejusa, the late Robert Aronda Nyakairima, Charles  Angina, Jim Oweyeigire, Julius Oketta Facki, Brigadier Phinehas Manoni Katirima, and Susan Lakot.

See also 
 List of members of the ninth Parliament of Uganda

References

External links 
 https://www.pgaction.org/pdf/2014-07-17-Kampala-List-of-Participants.pdf
 https://ugandaradionetwork.net/a/file.php?fileId=117347

Living people
1966 births
Parliament of Uganda
Members of the Parliament of Uganda
Women members of the Parliament of Uganda
Uganda People's Defence Force
Ugandan politicians by party